The women's shot put at the 1969 European Athletics Championships was held in Athens, Greece, at Georgios Karaiskakis Stadium on 16 September 1969.

Medalists

Results

Final
16 September

Participation
According to an unofficial count, 11 athletes from 6 countries participated in the event.

 (1)
 (2)
 (3)
 (1)
 (3)
 (1)

References

Shot put
Shot put at the European Athletics Championships
Euro